The N3 road in Belgium is a national road connecting the capital city Brussels to Aachen in Germany via Leuven, Tienen, Sint-Truiden and Liège. Its course is quite similar to that of European route E40 between Brussels and Aachen, which it intersects 3 times. The road runs through the 3 Belgian regions (Brussels, Flanders and Wallonia) and the 3 communities (Dutch-speaking, French-speaking and German-speaking).

Starting at the small Brussels ring road crossroad Arts-Loi in the City of Brussels, the road is first named Rue de la Loi (direction Brussels centrum) or Rue Belliard (direction Aachen), then enters the Belliard tunnel under the Cinquantenaire park before it becomes the Avenue de Tervueren/Tervurenlaan past the Tervuren gate in Etterbeek. The Avenue de Tervueren then crosses the municipality of Woluwe-Saint-Pierre from the Montgomery Place, passes along the Woluwe and Parmentier parks before it joins the Chaussée de Tervueren/Tervuursesteenweg in Auderghem. Past this intersection, the N3 road comes back to Woluwe-Saint-Pierre where it crosses the Brussels Ring after which it leaves the region of Brussels for Flanders in Tervuren, Flemish Brabant. 

Before it arrives to Leuven where it joins the N2 road on the Leuven Ring, the road crosses highways E40 in Bertem and E314 in Heverlee, a borough of Leuven. Between Leuven and Tienen the N3 road runs parallel to the E40 and the railroad Leuven-Tienen. Arriving in Sint-Truiden, the road enters the province of Limburg and leaves it for the Walloon province of Liège at Oreye. It intersects the E40 highway again at Loncin and then runs through the city centre of Liège and crosses the river Meuse there. Going north-east the road intersects the E40 for the 3rd time in Soumagne. The N3 finally crosses 2 municipalities of the German-speaking community (Lontzen and Kelmis). From Kelmis the German city of Aachen can be joined via the German road B264.

The N3 crosses or borders 31 municipalities in the country. 4 of them are in the Brussels Capital Region, 12 in Flemish Brabant, 2 in Limburg and 14 in Liège. Full municipality list below, with main municipalities in bold.

Junction list

See also
 Transport in Belgium

References

003
Roads in Brussels